Kuková is a village and municipality in Svidník District in the Prešov Region of north-eastern Slovakia.

History
In historical records the village was first mentioned in 1342.

Geography
The municipality lies at an altitude of 205 metres and covers an area of 10.608 km². It has a population of about 710 people.

External links
 
 
 https://web.archive.org/web/20080111223415/http://www.statistics.sk/mosmis/eng/run.html

 

Villages and municipalities in Svidník District
Šariš